Giantess Geyser is a fountain-type geyser in the Upper Geyser Basin of Yellowstone National Park. Eruptions generally occur 2 to 6 times a year. The surrounding area may shake from underground steam explosions just before the initial water and/or steam eruptions. Eruptions may occur twice hourly, experience a tremendous steam phase, and continue activity for 4 to 48 hours. The Geyser last erupted on August 26, 2020 after a six year, 210 day hiatus. A follow up eruption occurred 15 days later on 10 September 2020. Another eruption occurred on 11 August 2021

History
Giantess Geyser was one of the seven geysers named during the Washburn–Langford–Doane Expedition to the park region in 1870. Walter Trumbull, a member of the expedition described Giantess in his diary:

Nathaniel P. Langford in his Diary of the Washburn Expedition to the Yellowstone and Firehole Rivers in the year 1870 described the Giantess thus:

Gallery

References

External links

 

Geothermal features of Yellowstone National Park
Geysers of Wyoming
Geothermal features of Teton County, Wyoming
Geysers of Teton County, Wyoming